This is a selected list of international academic conferences in the fields of distributed computing, parallel computing, and concurrent computing.

Selection criteria 

The conferences listed here are major conferences of the area; they have been selected using the following criteria:-
 the notability of the conference has been confirmed by multiple independent sources; for example, it has been mentioned in textbooks or other sources, or it has received a high ranking
 the conference focuses on distributed and parallel computing (instead of having a much broader scope such as algorithms in general)
 the conference covers a reasonably large part of the fields of distributed and parallel computing (instead of focusing on a narrow sub-topic).
For the first criterion, references are provided; criteria 2–3 are usually clear from the name of the conference.

Conferences 

 CCGrid — IEEE/ACM International Symposium on Cluster, Cloud, and Internet Computing
 sponsored by IEEE Computer Society Technical Committee on Scalable Computing (TCSC) and ARC SIGARCH
 Organized annually since 2001
 DISC — International Symposium on Distributed Computing
 formerly: WDAG — Workshop on Distributed Algorithms on Graphs
 organized in cooperation with the European Association for Theoretical Computer Science (EATCS)
 ICDCS — International Conference on Distributed Computing Systems
 sponsored by IEEE Computer Society Technical Committee on Distributed Processing (TCDP)
 organized in 1979, 1981, 1983, and annually since 1984
 ICPADS — International Conference on Parallel and Distributed Systems
 sponsored by IEEE Computer Society Technical Committee on Distributed Processing (TCDP) and Technical Committee on Parallel Processing (TCPP)
 organized in 1992
 IPDPS — International Parallel and Distributed Processing Symposium 
 organized annually since 1987, next edition: 21-25 May. 2018, Vancouver, Canada
 sponsored by IEEE Computer Society Technical Committee on Distributed Processing (TCDP) and Technical Committee on Parallel Processing (TCPP)
 proceedings published by IEEE
 OPODIS — International Conference on Principles of Distributed Systems
 proceedings published by Springer in the LNCS series
 organized annually since 1997
 PODC — ACM Symposium on Principles of Distributed Computing
 sponsored by the ACM special interest groups SIGACT and SIGOPS
 organized annually since 1982
 HPDC — ACM Symposium on High-Performance Parallel and Distributed Computing
 sponsored by the ACM for design, implementation, evaluation, and the use of parallel and distributed systems for high-end computing
 PPoPP — ACM SIGPLAN Symposium on Principles and Practice of Parallel Programming
 sponsored by the ACM special interest group SIGPLAN
 organised in 1988 and 1990; biennially in 1991–2005; and annually since 2006
 SIROCCO — International Colloquium on Structural Information and Communication Complexity
 proceedings published by Springer in the LNCS series
 organized annually since 1994
 SPAA — ACM Symposium on Parallelism in Algorithms and Architectures
 formerly: ACM Symposium on Parallel Algorithms and Architectures
 sponsored by the ACM special interest groups SIGACT and SIGARCH, organized in cooperation with the European Association for Theoretical Computer Science (EATCS)
 organized annually since 1989
 CONCUR — International Conference on Concurrency Theory
 proceedings published in the LIPIcs–Leibniz International Proceedings in Informatics
 organised annually since 1988

See also 

 List of computer science conferences contains conferences in other areas of computer science.

Notes 

Distributed Computing Conferences